Swan Hills is an electoral district of the Legislative Assembly in the Australian state of Western Australia.

The district is located in the outer north-east of Perth.

Swan Hills is a marginal seat. It has been held by the government of the day on every occasion since its creation in 1989.

Geography
Based in the north-east corner of Perth's Metropolitan Region Scheme, Swan Hills covers large parts of the Swan Valley and Darling Scarp. The district takes in the communities of Aveley, Bailup, Belhus, Brigadoon, Bullsbrook, Chidlow Ellenbrook, Gidgegannup, Melaleuca, Mount Helena, Sawyers Valley, The Vines, Upper Swan and Wooroloo.

History
First contested at the 1989 state election, Swan Hills was created to replace the abolished seat of Mundaring. It was won on that occasion by Labor MP Gavan Troy, who had been the member for Mundaring since 1983. Troy retired at the 1993 state election, and the seat was picked up by the Liberal candidate June van de Klashorst when her party won government at the same election.

Two terms later, at the 2001 state election the seat again changed hands with a change of government. The new Labor MP was 24-year-old Jaye Radisich. Radisich retired at the 2008 state election, having failed to win Labor endorsement to contest a safer seat. The seat was then gained by Liberal candidate Frank Alban, continuing the pattern of seat going with the party that wins government.

Radisich died of cancer in 2012, and Labor recruited her brother, Ian Radisich, to challenge Alban at the 2013 state election. However, Alban easily won re-election as the Liberal-National government retained office with an increased majority. Alban was defeated by Jessica Shaw in the 2017 election by a large margin.

Members for Swan Hills

Election results

References

External links
 ABC election profiles: 2005 2008
 WAEC district maps: current boundaries, previous distributions

Swan Hills